Cyclamen alpinum (= Cyclamen trochopteranthum) is a perennial plant growing from a tuber, native to an area of southwestern Turkey, northwest of Antalya. It is isolated from other species of the Cyclamen coum group.

Name
The alternate species name trochopteranthum comes from Greek trochós "wheel" and pterón "feather", "wing", probably meaning "propeller" and ánthos "flower".

The scientific name Cyclamen alpinum has been applied to three other species as well: Cyclamen coum, Cyclamen cilicium, and Cyclamen intaminatum (as a variety of C. cilicium).

Description
Leaves are oval to round, green and often variegated with silver above (unlike the similar species Cyclamen parviflorum, which is entirely green) and red-purple below.

The flowers have five petals, pale rose-pink to pink-carmine or white with a dark magenta spot at the nose. The petals are spreading rather than fully upswept and often twisted like the blades of a propeller, as in Cyclamen parviflorum var. subalpinum.

Distribution

Forms
Cyclamen alpinum forma leucanthum (= Cyclamen alpinum forma album) has white petals.

References

External links

Cyclamen Society — 1997 expedition (Cyclamen trochopteranthum)
Paghat's Garden (Cyclamen trochopteranthum)
Pacific Bulb Society (Cyclamen trochopteranthum)
Mark Griffiths Inspiring Plants.org (Cyclamen alpinum)

photos — wild plants
photos — Jearrard's Herbal
photo — TrekNature
photo — South Wales Alpine Garden Society Show

alpinum

fr:Cyclamen coum#Un cyclamen à hélices
nl:Cyclamen coum#Een cyclaam met propellers